Web Cache Communication Protocol (WCCP) is a Cisco-developed content-routing protocol that provides a mechanism to redirect traffic flows in real-time.  It has built-in load balancing, scaling, fault tolerance, and service-assurance (failsafe) mechanisms.  Cisco IOS Release 12.1 and later releases allow the use of either Version 1 (WCCPv1) or Version 2 (WCCPv2) of the protocol.

WCCP allows utilization of Cisco Cache Engines (or other caches running WCCP) to localize web traffic patterns in the network, enabling content requests to be fulfilled locally. Traffic localization reduces transmission costs and download time.

Protocol Versions 

WCCPv1
 Only a single router services a cluster of systems
 Supports HTTP (TCP port 80) traffic flows only
 Provides generic routing encapsulation (GRE) to prevent packet modification
 Routers and cache engines communicate to each other via a control channel based on UDP port 2048

WCCPv2
 Allows for use across up to 32 routers (WCCP servers)
 Supports up to 32 engines/accelerators (WCCP clients)
 Supports any IP protocol including any TCP or UDP
 Supports up to 255 service groups (0-254)
 Adds MD5 shared secret security

Primary WCCP functions

Registration 
 Accelerator or Engine is a WCCP client
 Registers WCCP services (0-254) with “Here I Am” if application is operational
 Registration announces WCCP client on service group, provides availability notification, requests interesting traffic
 Transmits “Here I Am” every 10 seconds 
 Lead WCCP client (lowest IP address) instructs routers on protocol/port, assignment, forwarding, and return methods
 Router is a WCCP server
 Accepts service group registration (0-254)
 Acknowledges “Here I Am” with “I See You”
 Waits 30 (3x10) seconds before declaring engine failed
 Announce engines to other engines
 Router id is highest interface IP or highest loopback IP if one exists
 Redirects traffic to engine

Assignment 
 Selects an engine in the cluster 
 Hash 256 buckets
 Mask 128 buckets represented by 7 bit mask of the source or destination IP/Port

Redirect from Router to Cache Engine 
 Redirect list allows router to permit/deny traffic to intercept
 Two methods of redirection:
 WCCP L2: Local subnet only, little overhead. Rewrites packet MAC address to that of the local Engine
 WCCP GRE: Any IP-Subnet, more overhead. Creates tunnel from router to local or remote Engine.

Return from Cache Engine to Router 
 WCCP GRE return.
 WCCP L2 return.
 Engine can optionally return traffic any other way including routing.

Products that implement WCCP  

Whilst originally designed for Cisco's Content Cache appliance they have since added support to other products, including:
 ASR 1000 Routers 
 Application & Content Networking System (ACNS)
 Wide Area Application Services (WAAS)
 ASA/PIX Firewalls
 Some IOS versions
 IronPort S-Series Web Security Appliance
 Nexus 7000 Switches

Other vendors have also implemented WCCP support into their products, as it allows clustering and transparent deployment on networks using Cisco routers/switches without additional hardware. WCCP is of particular use to vendors of web cache/proxy/security appliances for redirection of web traffic. 
Please note that some vendors did not follow the standards when implementing WCCP and this could result in intercompatibility problems.

A list includes:

References

External links 
 Cisco
 Section WCCP Network Caching in the Cisco DocWiki (formerly known as the "Internetworking Technology Handbook")
 Section Configuring Web Cache Services Using WCCP in the "Cisco IOS Configuration Fundamentals Configuration Guide, Release 12.2"
 Section WCCPv2 and WCCP Enhancements in the feature guide for "Cisco IOS Software Releases 12.0 S"
 Configure WCCP on your Cisco IOS router on TechRepublic
 Web Cache Communication Protocol V2, revision 1 on IETF Web Site
 How to set up WCCP on your Barracuda Web Filter in Barracuda Networks Knowledgebase
Cisco protocols
Web caching protocol